The Kingdom of Lombardy could refer to:
Kingdom of the Lombards (568-774), the independent state
Kingdom of Italy (Holy Roman Empire) (855-1801), state of the Holy Roman Empire 
Kingdom of Lombardy–Venetia (1815-1866), state of the Austrian Empire